Symondsbury is a village and civil parish in southwest Dorset, England,  west of Bridport and  west of Dorchester. The village is located just to the north of the A35 trunk road, which runs between Southampton and Honiton. The village has a pub (the Ilchester Arms), a pottery and a primary school. The village is the head of Symondsbury Parish which extends from Eype and West Cliff (West Bay) in the south, to the Marshwood Vale in the north. The village is set in the Dorset Area of Outstanding Natural Beauty (AONB). In the 2011 census the parish had a population of 1,059.

Toponymy
The name Symondsbury derives from Old English and means the hill or barrow (beorg) belonging to a man named Sigemund. It was listed in the Domesday Book as Simondesberge.

History and economy
Symondsbury is recorded in the Domesday Book as having 31 households, with the lord of the manor being Cerne Abbey, which was also the lord at the time of the Norman Conquest.

In historical times the main economy of the village was the production of flax and hemp for Bridport's rope and net manufacturing trade.

More recently the main business has been milk, beef, sheep, pigs and arable production and, since the decline of agriculture in the late 20th century, the village has hosted two colleges, many small workshops and several large self-catering holiday lets. The village still has several orchards, two cider presses, one apple juice business, an orchard conservation company, artists, potters, an outdoor toddler group and a primary school. Many of the inhabitants still work in the village on the two business parks and other converted agricultural buildings.

The small River Simene passes through the parish. A tributary stream also wanders through the village itself, coming from a spring that is believed still to have healing properties. In the medieval age, people from miles around came to bathe their eyes, that were then allegedly healed. There is an old road from the sea through the village, that used to take pilgrims to the shrine of St Wite at Whitchurch Canonicorum.

In 2004/5 The Symondsbury Apple Project undertook research into Dorset's Orchard and cider history discovering that in Symondsbury parish there were over 100 acres of orchard in 1839.

Colmer's Hill

The main landmark in the village is the distinctive Colmer's Hill, a near-conical sandstone eminence topped by pine trees. It is highly visible from the main street in Bridport, and its significance extends back to around the 11th century.  The hill takes its name from the "Colmer Tenement". The family were tenants of the Dukes of Somerset and Earls of Ilchester in the 17th and 18th centuries and the Rev. John Colmer was the rector from 1805–06.

During World War I 12 Scots Pine trees were planted on the summit by Major W P Colfox MC in memory of 12 local men who were killed in battle, and the hill now forms an iconic subject for artists and photographers.

Church
The parish church of St John the Baptist is in Early English style and cruciform shape, it has a nave, transepts, south porch and square tower with six small bells and a clock. The registers date from 1558. Records show that the first rector arrived in 1325. In the north and south transept there are spyholes, known as squints, through which the congregation could see the priest at the altar.

The stained glass in a memorial window in the church was designed around 1884 by William Lethaby, who later became Professor of Ornament & Design at the Royal College of Art.

Principal houses
The principal houses in the village are Symondsbury Manor, Shutes Farmhouse and the Old Rectory (now known as Oakhayes).

Like many so-called manor houses, this one has not formed the administrative centre of the manorial landholding. It was not until the 20th century when the then owners, the Colfox family, had collected together much of the previously manorial land that the house acquired this title. In 1975 the house was separated from the land and sold to Peter Hitchin.  Originally a medieval farmhouse, it was heavily remodelled by Crickmay in the late 19th century for the Symonds Udall family to whom Thomas Hardy and William Barnes were regular visitors.

Shutes Farmhouse, originally a medieval hall house, was built from trees felled in 1449. Symondsbury was held by the Abbey of Cerne until dissolution, whence it passed to the Dukes of Somerset and this was the administrative centre of their manorial landholding. In 1672 the Duchess of Somerset, to clear the debts of the late Duke, sold much of Symondsbury in nearly two dozen lots to various tenants, but retained Shutes Farmhouse (the Colmer tenement) as the centre of the residual manorial holding which along with the Lordship were sold shortly afterwards to the Earl of Ilchester whose heir still holds the title, but no land.

Oakhayes was built in two phases at the beginning and end of the 18th century. It was such a rich living that the rector at the time even boasted his own pack of hounds and the kennels can still be seen.  An engraving of the house dated 1799 was published in the History of Dorset by John Hutchins.

Demography
In the 2011 census the parish had 581 dwellings, 486 households and a population of 1,059.

Transport
The village is about half a mile (800 metres) from the A35 Folkestone-Honiton trunk road. It has no bus service but the No. X51 (formerly X31) Dorchester to Axminster bus and the X53 Poole to Exeter bus stop on West Road for Symondsbury at Sprakes Corner, half a mile (800 metres) away. Symondsbury has several footpaths into the surrounding area.

References

External links

Symondsbury Parish
Symondsbury Manor
Symondsbury Estate
 The School
 The Symondsbury Apple Project
 Treewise Environmental Learning

Villages in Dorset